Jamna Dolna  ( Yamna Dolishnia) is a non-existing village in the administrative district of Gmina Ustrzyki Dolne, within Bieszczady County, Subcarpathian Voivodeship, in south-eastern Poland.

References

Jamna Dolna